Kepez may refer to:

Kepez, Antalya, an intracity district of Antalya, Turkey
 Kepez Belediyesi B.K., sports club based in the district
Kepez, Akçadağ, a town in Malatya Province. Includes Kürecik, home for Kürecik Radar Station 
Kepez, Çanakkale, a town in Çanakkale Province, Turkey
Kepez, Silifke, a village in Silifke district of Mersin Province
Kepez, Sındırgı, a village